David Stephenson may refer to:

David Stephenson (rugby league, born 1958) (1958–2022), rugby league player for Warrington & Great Britain
David Stephenson (rugby league, born 1972), English rugby league player for Oldham, Hull & Rochdale
David Stephenson (climatologist), British academic at the University of Exeter
David Stephenson (poet), American poet
D. C. Stephenson (1891–1966), Grand Dragon of the Ku Klux Klan in Indiana in the 1920s
David Stephenson (architect) (1757–1819), English architect who worked in Newcastle upon Tyne and Northumberland
David Stephenson (photographer) (born 1955), American–Australian photographer

See also
David Stevenson (disambiguation)